Virgil Ierunca (born Virgil Untaru ; August 16, 1920, Lădești, Vâlcea County – September 28, 2006, Paris) was a Romanian literary critic, journalist and poet. He was married to Monica Lovinescu.

Both Ierunca and Lovinescu worked for several decades for Radio Free Europe.

In 2006 both were members of the Romanian Presidential Commission for the Study of the Communist Dictatorship in Romania; the Commission's chairman, Vladimir Tismăneanu, called them "the most honest and dignified couple 
in the history of Romanian culture".

Published books

Fenomenul Pitești (Ed. Humanitas, Bucharest, 1990) 
Românește (Ed. Humanitas, Bucharest, 1991) 
Subiect şi predicat (Ed. Humanitas, Bucharest, 1993) 
Dimpotrivă (Ed. Humanitas, Bucharest, 1994) 
Semnul mirării (Ed. Humanitas, Bucharest, 1995) 
Trecut-au anii (Ed. Humanitas, Bucharest, 2000)
Poeme de exil (Ed. Humanitas, Bucharest, 2001)

External links
 Vladimir Tismăneanu, "Ce-i datorăm lui Virgil Ierunca", Evenimentul Zilei, October 4, 2006

1920 births
2006 deaths
People from Vâlcea County
Romanian journalists
Romanian literary critics
Romanian male poets
Romanian expatriates in France
Romanian defectors
20th-century Romanian poets
Radio Free Europe/Radio Liberty people
20th-century journalists